Nicaragua (officially the Republic of Nicaragua  ) is a country in Central America, bordering both the Caribbean Sea and the North Pacific Ocean, between Costa Rica and Honduras. Nicaragua is the largest country in Central America in square kilometers.

Nicaragua covers a total area of 130,370 square kilometers (119,990 square kilometers of which is land area) and contains a variety of climates and terrains. The country's physical geography divides it into three major zones: the Pacific lowlands, the wetter, cooler central highlands, and the Caribbean lowlands.

Natural regions

The natural regions of Nicaragua are the Pacific lowlands, central highlands, and Caribbean lowlands.

Pacific lowlands
The Pacific lowlands extend about 75 kilometers inland from the Pacific coast. Most of the area is flat, except for a line of young volcanoes, many of which are still active, running between the Golfo de Fonseca and Lago de Nicaragua. These peaks lie just west of a large crustal fracture or structural rift that forms a long, narrow depression passing southeast across the isthmus from the Golfo de Fonseca to the Río San Juan.

The rift is occupied in part by the largest freshwater lakes in Central America: Lago de Managua (56 kilometers long and 24 kilometers wide) and Lago de Nicaragua (about 160 kilometers long and 75 kilometers wide). These two lakes are joined by the Río Tipitapa, which flows south into Lago de Nicaragua. Lago de Nicaragua in turn drains into the Río San Juan (the boundary between Nicaragua and Costa Rica), which flows through the southern part of the rift lowlands to the Caribbean Sea.

The valley of the Río San Juan forms a natural passageway close to sea level across the Nicaraguan isthmus from the Caribbean Sea to Lago de Nicaragua and the rift. From the southwest edge of Lago de Nicaragua, it is only nineteen kilometers to the Pacific Ocean. This route was considered as a possible alternative to the Panama Canal at various times in the past.

Surrounding the lakes and extending northwest of them along the rift valley to the Golfo de Fonseca are fertile lowland plains highly enriched with volcanic ash from nearby volcanoes. These lowlands are densely populated and well cultivated. The natural vegetation of the Pacific lowlands is dry forest, but much of it has been converted to agriculture or pasture. More directly west of the lake region is a narrow line of ash-covered hills and volcanoes that separate the lakes from the Pacific Ocean. This line is highest in the central portion near the cities of León and Managua.

Because Western Nicaragua is located where two major tectonic plates collide, it is subject to earthquakes and volcanic eruptions. Although periodic volcanic eruptions have caused agricultural damage from fumes and ash, earthquakes have been by far more destructive to life and property. Hundreds of shocks occur each year, some of which cause severe damage. The capital city of Managua was virtually destroyed in 1931 and again in 1972.

Central highlands
The triangular area known as the central highlands lies northeast and east of the Pacific lowlands. These rugged mountains are composed of ridges 900 to 1,800 meters high and a mixed forest of oak and pine alternating with deep valleys that drain primarily toward the Caribbean. Very few significant streams flow west to the Pacific Ocean. Those that do are steep, short, and flow intermittently.

The relatively dry western slopes of the central highlands, protected by the ridges of the highlands from the moist winds of the Caribbean, have drawn farmers from the Pacific region since colonial times. The eastern slopes of the highlands are covered with montane rain forests and are lightly populated with pioneer agriculturalists and small communities of indigenous people.

Caribbean lowlands
The eastern Caribbean lowlands of Nicaragua form the extensive (occupying more than 50 percent of national territory) and still sparsely settled lowland area known as the Costa de Mosquitos (Miskito Coast). The Caribbean lowlands are sometimes considered synonymous with the former department of Zelaya, which is now divided into the North Caribbean Coast Autonomous Region (Región Autónoma de la Costa Caribe Norte, RACCN) and the South Caribbean Coast Autonomous Region (Región Autónoma de la Costa Caribe Sur, RACCS) and constitutes about 45 percent of Nicaragua's territory.

These lowlands are a hot, humid area that includes coastal plains, the eastern spurs of the central highlands, and the lower portion of the Río San Juan basin. The soil is generally leached and infertile. Pine and palm savannas predominate along the Caribbean coast as far south as the Laguna de Perlas. There are extensive areas of tropical rain forest, including the Isthmian–Atlantic moist forests extending southwards from the Laguna de Perlas past the Río San Juan into Costa Rica, and the Central American Atlantic moist forests lying between the savannas and the central highlands, and along rivers through the savannas.

Fertile soils are found only along the natural levees and narrow floodplains of the numerous rivers, including the Escondido, the Río Grande de Matagalpa, the Prinzapolka, and the Coco, and along the many lesser streams that rise in the central highlands and cross the region en route to the complex of shallow bays, lagoons, and salt marshes of the Caribbean coast.

Climate
Temperature varies little with the seasons in Nicaragua and is largely a function of elevation. Here, daytime temperatures average , and night temperatures drop to  most of the year.

Here, daytime temperatures are mild (and nights are cool.

Tierra fria, the "cold land" at elevations above , is found only on and near the highest peaks of the central highlands.

Rainfall 
Rainfall varies greatly in Nicaragua. The western slopes of the central highlands and the Pacific lowlands receive considerably less annual rainfall, being protected from moisture-laden Caribbean trade winds by the peaks of the central highlands.

Rainfall is seasonal—May through October is the rainy season, and December through April is the driest period.

During the rainy season, Eastern Nicaragua is subject to heavy flooding along the upper and middle reaches of all major rivers. Near the coast, where river courses widen and river banks and natural levees are low, floodwaters spill over onto the floodplains until large sections of the lowlands become continuous sheets of water. River bank agricultural plots are often heavily damaged, and considerable numbers of savanna animals die during these floods.

The coast is also subject to destructive tropical storms and hurricanes, particularly from July through October. The high winds and floods, accompanying these storms often cause considerable destruction of property. In addition, heavy rains (called papagayo storms) accompanying the passage of a cold front or a low-pressure area may sweep from the north through both eastern and western Nicaragua (particularly the rift valley) from November through March.

Hurricanes or heavy rains in the central highlands where agriculture has destroyed much of the natural vegetation also cause considerable crop damage and soil erosion. In 1988, Hurricane Joan forced hundreds of thousands of Nicaraguans to flee their homes and caused more than US$1 billion in damage, most of it along the Caribbean coast. In November 2020, two major hurricanes: Eta and Iota, made landfall on the nation in nearly same locations in consecutive weeks, causing hundreds of deaths throughout the caribbean region and causing millions of dollars in damage.

Examples

Environment 
Nicaragua is subject to destructive earthquakes, volcanoes, landslides, and occasionally severe hurricanes. It currently faces deforestation, soil erosion, and water pollution. It is a party to the United Nations Framework Convention on Climate Change, the Climate Change-Kyoto Protocol, the Nuclear Test Ban, and the Ozone Layer Protection, and has signed but not ratified the Law of the Sea.

Extreme points 

 Northernmost point: North of Liwa Sirpe
 Southernmost point: Trinidad, Río San Juan
 Westernmost point: Pacific coast at Gulf of Fonseca, Chinandega Department
 Easternmost point: Miskito Cays archipelago, North Caribbean Coast Autonomous Region
 Lowest point: Pacific Ocean 0 m
 Highest point: Mogotón 2,085 m

Maritime claims 

 Contiguous zone: 
 Territorial sea: 
 Exclusive economic zone:

See also 

 List of ecoregions in Nicaragua
 List of islands of Nicaragua
 List of rivers of Nicaragua
 List of volcanoes in Nicaragua
 Protected areas of Nicaragua
 Territorial disputes of Nicaragua
 Water resources management in Nicaragua

References